Money No Enough is a 1998 Singaporean comedy film about three friends with financial problems who start a car polishing business together. Original story by J P Tan and written by Jack Neo, directed by Tay Teck Lock and produced by JSP Films, the movie stars Neo, Mark Lee and Henry Thia. It was released in cinemas on 7 May 1998. Money No Enough received mixed reviews from critics, but earned over S$5.8 million and was the all-time highest-grossing Singaporean film until 2012. Its success helped revive the Singaporean film industry and pave the way for the emergence of other Singaporean cultural phenomena.

It was followed by a sequel, Money No Enough 2, which also stars Neo, Lee, and Thia, but has a new story that is not connected to the original, although Thia's character is also named Hui.

Plot
The plot revolves around the lives of three close friends: Keong (Jack Neo), a spendthrift white-collar worker, Ong (Mark Lee), a general contractor, and Hui (Henry Thia), a kopi tiam waiter, who is single and lives with his elderly mother, and wastes his meagre salary on 4D and pursuing an insurance agent who he has a crush on.

One day, things change for the worse for Keong when his boss (Chen Zhao Jin) picks a newcomer, Jeremiah Lee (Ernest Seah), over him as manager and is transferred to a different department - partly due to his poor English and inability to understand computer technology. This culminates in Keong having a heated argument with his boss and resigning, to the dismay of his wife, to whom he assures that he will get another, only to be turned down due to his insuffiencies.

Ong borrows S$40,000 from loan sharks, and plans to repay them after collecting a debt owed him by a friend who in turn borrowed from a Taiwanese who scams him, and subsequently runs away. He sells his car to repay, but it's not enough. The loan sharks beat up Ong for not repaying the loan within the two-week deadline, but gives him another week upon Ong's pleas.

With bills (especially installments) to pay, his possessions confiscated, and a family to support, Keong goes heavily into debt whereupon his wife leaves him, taking their daughter with her. 

In an attempt to resolve their financial problems, the three friends decide to start a car polishing business together with the limited capital they have. However, at the opening ceremony of their business, Hui's mother collapses and is taken to hospital, where she is diagnosed with leukemia. Hui has three wealthy older sisters, but they refuse to help pay the medical bills, and his application for financial assistance is rejected because of his sisters' high incomes. To compound matters, the loan sharks show up at the company to harass Ong, who then flees to Johor Bahru.

Ong and Hui ask to cash out their shares so they can pay the loan sharks and medical bills respectively, but all their money has already been spent on equipment and other business running costs. Hui's mother dies and at her wake, which raises ten thousand dollars of 'bai jin' (contributions toward funeral expenses) initiated by his sisters. Later, before the funeral march, Hui lashes out at his sisters for their selfishness and greediness (refusal to pay medical fees and having people donate money for their funeral expenses rather than using their own).

As Ong joins the funeral march, the loan sharks turn up, pursue him and are arrested after a lengthy police chase.  Keong convinces his wife and daughter to enter an obstacle race where they win the first prize of S$100,000, which he uses to pay his creditors, and his family is reunited. The car polishing business is successful, and the three friends go on to become the directors of Autoglym Singapore.

In the epilogue, though, it is revealed that the three still borrow money - with Ong and Hui borrowing from Keong and leaving him with an empty wallet.

Cast
 Jack Neo as Keong
 Mark Lee as Ong
 Henry Thia as Hui

Production
In the 1990s, Neo, Lee and Thia became well known in Singapore for their performances in the Channel 8 television show Comedy Night (Wade-Giles: Kao hsiao hsin tung). Neo then acted in the 1997 Eric Khoo film 12 Storeys, and saw potential in the then virtually nonexistent local film industry. He wrote a screenplay about expatriates in the advertising industry, but decided the concept would not appeal to most Singaporeans, so he thought of writing a story about Ah Bengs (uneducated Chinese men), drawing on the humble backgrounds of Lee, Thia and himself. Inspired, he contacted Tay Teck Lock, a former producer for Channel 8, and suggested they collaborate. They decided on a plot about three Singaporean men facing financial difficulties. Neo spent eight months writing the script, while Tay helped develop the characters and jokes. Despite the Speak Mandarin Campaign, Neo chose to use Hokkien dialogue to "reflect real life" and "reach a different audience".

Money No Enough was produced by JSP Films on a budget of S$850,000. The production crew included Deri Ng as first assistant director, J.P. Tan as producer, Kamis as cinematographer, A. Supranamian as film editor, Anthony Ng as art director and Abdul Shukar Mohd as sound designer. Filming was plagued by financial problems, such as poor quality shooting equipment. After the Board of Film Censors reviewed and approved Money No Enough, distributor Shaw Organisation released the film on 21 screens on 7 May 1998. The success of the movie led to a dispute between Neo and Producer over their shares of the profits. To mark its tenth anniversary, Money No Enough was released in cinemas again and was followed by a sequel, Money No Enough 2.

Reception
Money No Enough earned S$50,000 from sneak previews and S$42,000 on its opening day, then topped the local box office for a month. In total, the film made S$5.8 million, which remained the best box-office showing by a local movie until the record was broken by Ah Boys to Men in 2012. After its box office run, 70,000 VCDs of Money No Enough were sold, which remains a record for a Singaporean film. Its success  sparked the film career of Jack Neo, who won the Best Director Award at the 1998 Silver Screen Awards, and the development of the Singaporean film industry. Four more Singaporean movies were produced in 1998, two of which were described by critics as copycats of Money No Enough. With its use of Hokkien and crude portrayal of Singaporean life, the film is also credited with paving the way for other Singaporean cultural phenomena such as mrbrown and TalkingCock.

The movie received a mixed critical reception with LoveHKFilm.com commending the film as "an effective satire of...Singaporean culture" and noted that the actors "do a credible job representing characters from Singapore's varying social strata", while a Variety review described the movie as "initially fresh and amusing but ultimately too one-note and local in its humor to travel far". Francis Dass of the New Straits Times wrote that Money No Enough was "spot-on" and "funny", but criticised the "clichéd script and the director's penchant for melodrama".

References

External links

 

1998 films
1990s Mandarin-language films
Hokkien-language films
1998 comedy films
Singaporean comedy films